Joshua Rock (born 13 April 2001) is a Northern Irish professional darts player who currently plays in Professional Darts Corporation (PDC) events. In his debut year at the international level, he won the 2022 PDC World Youth Championship. He is the first player to throw a televised nine-dart finish in their debut year at the 2022 Grand Slam of Darts in the match against Michael van Gerwen.

Career
In 2021 he reached a final in Irish Classic and lost 3–5 to Shaun McDonald. He defeated on the way to the finals some high-rank players like Brian Raman. Beside he played himself into the quarter-finals of the Irish Open. At this tournament he reached one of the highest average in the history of tournaments organized by the World Darts Federation, beating Nick Fullwell 4–0 in third round with 111.33 average.

At Q-School in 2022, Rock won his Tour Card on the final day of qualifying by defeating his fellow countryman Nathan Rafferty, earning a two-year card on the PDC circuit. He played on the PDC Development Tour for the first time in February, and reaching three finals in his first three events and winning two of them. In November, Rock achieved his first televised 9-dart finish in the last 16 of the 2022 Grand Slam of Darts, in an eventual 10–8 defeat to Michael van Gerwen. Later that month, Rock won the PDC World Youth Championship by beating Nathan Girvan 6–1 with an average of 104.13, a record for a World Youth final.

2023
In his debut at the 2023 World Championship, Rock beat José Justicia, Callan Rydz and Nathan Aspinall before losing 4–3 to Jonny Clayton in the fourth round.

World Championship results

PDC
 2023: Fourth round (lost to Jonny Clayton 3–4)

Performance timeline

PDC European Tour

(W) Won; (F) finalist; (SF) semifinalist; (QF) quarterfinalist; (#R) rounds 6, 5, 4, 3, 2, 1; (RR) round-robin stage; (Prel.) Preliminary round; (DNQ) Did not qualify; (DNP) Did not participate; (NH) Not held; (EX) Excluded; (WD) Withdrew

Nine-dart finishes

References

2001 births
Living people
Professional Darts Corporation current tour card holders
PDC world youth champions
People from Antrim, County Antrim
Darts players from Northern Ireland